(Roman Catholic) Diocese of Concordia may refer to the following Latin Catholic jurisdictions :

 the current Roman Catholic Diocese of Concordia in Argentina, Argentina
 the former Roman Catholic Diocese of Concordia (Italy), now Roman Catholic Diocese of Concordia-Pordenone
  the former Roman Catholic Diocese of Concordia in Kansas, now Roman Catholic Diocese of Salina, in Kansas, USA